The sixth and final season of Teen Wolf, an American supernatural drama created by Jeff Davis and to some extent based on the 1985 film of the same name, received an order of 20 episodes on July 9, 2015, and premiered on November 15, 2016. The second half of the season premiered on July 30, 2017.

Unlike the previous season, instead of telling a single story, the season was split into two 10-episode arcs, following the same format of the third season. On July 21, 2016, the cast announced at Comic Con that the series would end after its sixth season. The final episode aired on September 24, 2017.

Premise
Scott, Stiles, Lydia, Malia and the rest of the pack return to Beacon Hills High for the second semester of senior year. Everyone will be feeling a bit emotional and anxious as they inch closer to graduation and the thought of imminently parting ways almost becomes a reality. But their last semester in high school will not go without trouble. Teen Wolf executive producer Jeff Davis revealed that the sixth season will be a "ghost story".

Cast

Main
 Tyler Posey as Scott McCall
 Dylan O'Brien as Stiles Stilinski
 Holland Roden as Lydia Martin
 Shelley Hennig as Malia Tate
 Dylan Sprayberry as Liam Dunbar
 Linden Ashby as Sheriff Noah Stilinski
 Melissa Ponzio as Melissa McCall
 JR Bourne as Chris Argent

Recurring and guest

Episodes

Production
The sixth season of Teen Wolf received an order of 20 episodes on July 9, 2015. Instead of telling a single story, the season was broken into two 10 episode arcs. Filming for the season started on February 22, 2016.

On April 11, 2016, Arden Cho announced she would not be returning for season 6. New recurring characters include Ross Butler as Nathan and Pete Ploszek as Garrett Douglas. Sibongile Mlambo joined the series as Beacon Hills' new humanities teacher and guidance counselor. 

Tyler Posey directed the thirteenth episode of the season, which was his first time directing an episode of Teen Wolf. Linden Ashby, who portrays Sheriff Stilinski, directed the fourteenth episode for the season, which was also a first for Ashby.

On March 7, 2017, Meagan Tandy confirmed that, while she was invited back to reprise her role as Braeden, she would not be able to do so due to scheduling conflicts with other television projects.

Reception
The final season received positive reviews, though many expressed disappointment from Dylan O'Brien's absence in the final season and others criticized the show's pacing. The review aggregator website Rotten Tomatoes reported an approval rating of 83% and an average rating of 6.94/10 for the sixth season, based on 12 reviews. The website's critics consensus reads, "The full moon ends its lunar cycle in this fast-paced final season, bringing Teen Wolf to a narratively messy but emotionally satisfying conclusion."

References

2016 American television seasons
2017 American television seasons
Teen Wolf (2011 TV series)
Split television seasons
Celtic mythology in popular culture
Japanese mythology in popular culture
Norse mythology in popular culture